The Professional Putters Association (PPA) was started in 1959 by Don Clayton, the founder of Putt-Putt Golf, in Fayetteville, North Carolina. Originally begun as the Professional Putt-Putt Golfers Association in 1959, the name was changed in 1960 to the Professional Putters Association. The organization was formed to provide tournaments and competition for those who viewed putting as a sport. Since 1959, the PPA has held a National Championship Tournament.

The PPA has awarded over $8,000,000 in prize money over the past 52 years. Billy Packer, best known  for his work on college basketball telecasts for both NBC and CBS, and Frank Glieber, longtime sportscaster for CBS, served as the announcers for the Putt-Putt Golf Courses Championship TV series.

Timeline 

1960 - The first National Tournament Program of the PPA offered $26,000 in prize money. 
1961 - The first putting match ever to be filmed for television was the PPA "Parade of Champions" TV Series. 
1965 - The PPA expanded to worldwide tournaments. The first foreign tournaments were held in Africa, with Australia, Japan, and Canada following soon after. 
1969 - The Amateur Putters Association (APA) began. Today, amateur putters compete in their own division in all PPA tournaments. 
1970 - Vance Randall was honored as the 1960s Putter of the Decade. 
1973 - The PPA sponsored the World Putting Championship tournament offering over $200,000 in prize money. Mike Baldoza captured the first place money of $50,000. 
1980 - Dick and Evelyn Florin were honored as the 1970s Putters of the Decade. 
1987 - The PPA inducted its first members into the newly created Putt-Putt/PPA Hall of Fame. 
1990 - Ron Frederick was honored as the 1980s Putter of the Decade. 
1995 - The PPA TV Series is shown worldwide on ESPN. 
1998 - Over $7,500,000 awarded in the 39 years of the PPA 
2000 - The PPA awards $100,000 in prize money for the 2000 PPA National Championship. Alan Quinnelly's victory makes him the only three-time winner of this event as a professional. The $50,000 first place check made him the sport's all-time career leading money winner at the time. 
2001 - Greg Ward was honored as the 1990s Putter of the Decade 
2002 - The PPA World Match Play Championship returns to the schedule and is won by Greg Ward in Martinez, Georgia
2005 - Greg Ward surpasses Alan Quinnelly as the sport's all-time leading money winner.

See also
Putt-Putt Fun Center

External links 
 

Golf associations
Miniature golf
Organizations based in North Carolina
Sports organizations established in 1959